The 2021 Towson Tigers football team represented Towson University in the 2021 NCAA Division I FCS football season. They were led by 12th-year head coach Rob Ambrose, and played their home games at Johnny Unitas Stadium in Towson, Maryland. They played as members of the Colonial Athletic Association (CAA).

Schedule

References

Towson
Towson Tigers football seasons
Towson Tigers football